The Fantastical Portraits or Fantasy Portraits (French: Portraits de fantaisie) are a series of portraits by the French painter Jean-Honoré Fragonard, mostly dating to 1769. It is said that each was executed in a single hour, from which they gained the Italian name fa' presto (made quickly).

References
 Pierre Cabanne, Fragonard, Paris, Somogy, 1987, 1e éd., 156 p., p. 57 and 58

Paintings by Jean-Honoré Fragonard
1769 paintings
18th-century portraits
Portraits of men